Australian National Boxing Hall of Fame was founded in 2001 and began inducting boxers into the Hall of Fame in 2003. Since then annual induction dinners have been held across Australia. 

Inductees are nominated and then voted upon by a panel of boxing experts and historians across Australia. 

Current committee members are:  

President - Brett McCormick.                       Vice President - Angie McCormick.           Treasurer & Founder - David Hanvey.      Secretary - Damian Membrey.                  Historian & Life Member - Peter Banks.  

The Hall of Fame has now introduced an ANBHOF Fighter of the year and also the Gus Mercurio Memorial Award for services to boxing for those who are not Inducted into the Australian National Boxing Hall of Fame.

Inductees

Legends
 Les Darcy (2009)
 Lionel Rose (2010)
 Johnny Famechon (2012)
 Jeff Fenech (2013)

Pioneers

 Young Griffo (2003)
 Larry Foley (2003)
 Peter Jackson (2004)
 Frank Slavin (2005)
 Joe Goddard (2006)
 Jim Hall (2007)
 Jim Barron (2007)
 Bill Farnan (2008)
 Jack McGowan (2008)
 Bill Doherty (2009)
 Tim Hegarty (2010)
 Dan Creedon (2011)
 Peter Felix (2012)
 Mick Dooley (2013)
 Otto Cribb (2014)
 Herb McKell (2015)
 Jim Burge (2016)
 George Dawson (2017)
 James "Tut" Ryan (2018)

Old Timers

 Les Darcy (2003)
 Ambrose Palmer (2003)
 Jack Carroll (2003)
 Billy Grime (2003)
 Bill Lang (2004)
 Hugh Dwyer (2004)
 Tommy Uren (2005)
 Fred Henneberry (2005)
 Jackie Green (2006)
 Bill Squires (2006)
 George Mendies (2007)
 Herb McCoy (2007)
 Sid Godfrey (2008)
 Jerry Jerome (2008)
 Dave Smith (2009)
 Hughie Mehegan (2009)
 Mickey Miller (2010)
 Merv Blandon (2010)
 Fred Kay (2011)
 Frank Thorn (2012)
 Jack Haines (2013)
 Alf Blatch (2014)
 Bert Spargo (2015)
 Colin Bell (2016)
 Arthur Cripps (2017)
 Hockey Bennell (2018)

Veterans

 Ron Richards (2003)
 Vic Patrick (2003)
 Jimmy Carruthers (2003)
 Dave Sands (2003)
 Tommy Burns (2004, born Geoffrey Murphy)
 George Barnes (2004)
 Elley Bennett (2005)
 Jack Hassen (2005)
 Pat Ford (2006)
 Trevor King (2006)
 Mickey Tollis (2007)
 Frank Flannery (2007)
 George Bracken (2008)
 Eddie Miller (2008)
 Bobby Sinn (2009)
 Clive Stewart (2009)
 Tony Madigan (2010)
 Rocky Gattellari (2010)
 Jeff White (2011)
 Wally Taylor (2012)
 Max Carlos (2013)
 Jack Johnson (2014)
 Darby Brown (2015)
 Russell Sands (2016)
 Bobby Dunne (2017)
 Al Bourke (2018)

Modern

 Johnny Famechon (2003)
 Lionel Rose (2003)
 Barry Michael (2003)
 Jeff Fenech (2003)
 Rocky Mattioli (2004)
 Jeff Harding (2004)
 Tony Mundine (2005)
 Hector Thompson (2005)
 Paul Ferreri (2006)
 Bob Dunlop (2006)
 Lester Ellis (2007)
 Jeff Malcolm (2007)
 Lawrence Austin (2008)
 Charkey Ramon (2008)
 Henry Nissen (2009)
 Troy Waters (2009)
 Kostya Tszyu (2010)
 Wally Carr (2010)
 Steve Aczel (2011)
 Robbie Peden (2012)
 Guy Waters (2013)
 Brian Janssen (2014) 
 Tony Miller (2015) 
 Ken Salisbury (2016) 
 Paul Briggs (2017)
 Shannan Taylor (2018)

Non-Participants

 HD McIntosh      (2003)
 Snowy Baker      (2003)
 Jack Dunleavy    (2003)
 Ron Casey        (2004)
 John Wren        (2004)
 Merv William     (2005)
 Ray Mitchell     (2005)
 Johnny Lewis      (2006)
 Bill Mordey      (2007)
 Ray Connelly     (2007)
 Gus Mercurio     (2008)
 Jack Rennie      (2008)
 William Lawless      (2009)
 John McDougall      (2009)
 Ern McQuillan Sr      (2010)
 Billy Males      (2010)
 Jimmy Sharman      (2011)
 Ray Wheatley   (2012)
 William Corbett (2013)
 Terry Reilly (2014)
 Bill McConnell (2015) 
 Joe Wallis (2016)
 Grantlee Kieza (2017)
 Tom Maguire (2018)

Honorary Internationals

 Jack Johnson     (2003)
 Freddie Dawson   (2003)
 Sam Langford     (2004)
 Archie Moore     (2005)
 Bob Fitzsimmons  (2006)
 Tod Morgan       (2007)
 Ted "Kid" Lewis  (2007)
 Tommy Burns  (2009)
 Jimmy Clabby      (2010)
 Clarence Reeves   (2011)
 Joe Bugner        (2012)
 "Hop" Harry Stone (2013)
 Jem Mace (2014) 
 Eugène Criqui (2015) 
 Eddie McGoorty (2016)
 Fritz Holland (2017) 
 Lovemore N'Dou (2018)

Gus Mercurio Memorial Award

 "Hollywood" Howard Leigh (2017)
 Paul Nasari (2018)

ANBHOF Fighter of the year award 

 Zac Dunn (2015)
 Jayde Mitchell (2016)
 Jeff Horn (2017)
 T.J. Doheny (2018)

See also

Boxing Australia which governs Amateur boxing in Australia
Australian National Boxing Federation which governs Professional boxing in Australia

References

External links

Boxing museums and halls of fame
Halls of fame in Australia
Australian sports trophies and awards
Boxing in Australia
2001 establishments in Australia
Awards established in 2001